Bodan may refer to:

 Bodan Arsovski, a Macedonian musician
 Bodan Shonendan, the Japanese name for the Korean musical group BTS
 Bodan-Werft, a German company
 Bođani, a village in Serbia
 , a ceremony practiced by the Chitpavan community in India

See also 
 Boda (disambiguation)
 Bohdan (disambiguation)
 Bogdan